The Portrait of Antoine-Laurent Lavoisier and his Wife (French: Portrait d'Antoine-Laurent Lavoisier et de sa femme) is a double portrait of the French chemist Antoine Lavoisier and his wife and collaborator Marie-Anne Pierrette Paulze, commissioned from the French painter Jacques-Louis David in 1788 by Marie-Anne (who had been taught drawing by David). It is now in the Metropolitan Museum of Art in New York.

History 
David was paid 7,000 livres for the portrait on 16 December 1788. It was not permitted a public display at the Paris Salon for fear that an image of Lavoisier – a figure connected to the royal court and the Ancien Régime – might provoke anti-aristocratic aggression from viewers.

In 1836, the painting was left by Marie-Anne to her great-niece, and it remained in the collection of the comtesse de Chazelles and her descendants until 1924, when it was bought by John Davison Rockefeller. Rockefeller gave it to the Rockefeller Institute for Medical Research in 1927, and it was acquired from this institution by the Metropolitan Museum in 1977.

Description 
The work is painted in oils on a canvas of 259.7 × 194.6 cm.

It shows the couple in Lavoisier's office, with a wood-panelled floor and walls of false marble with three classical pilasters. In the centre the couple face the viewer, with both their heads in three-quarters profile. Marie-Anne is shown standing, looking at the viewer. Her costume is that in fashion at the end of the 18th century – powdered hair, a white dress with a lace-edged ruffled neckline, and a blue fabric sash. She rests on her husband's shoulder, with her right hand leaning on the table.

Antoine Lavoisier is seated, wearing a black vest, culottes, stockings and buckled shoes, a white shirt with a lace jabot and powdered hair. His face turns towards his wife and he rests his left arm on the table, whilst writing with his right hand using a quill pen. The table is covered with scarlet velvet, many papers, a casket, an inkwell with two more quill pens, a barometer, a gasometer, a water still and a glass bell jar. A large round-bottom flask and a tap are on the floor to the right, by the table. To the table's extreme left is a chair with a large document-case and black cloth on it. The document-case, presumed to correspond to Madame's interest in the art of drawing, emphasizes a left-to-right symmetry in the portrait between M. Lavoisier and objects of science visibly displayed on the right, and Madame with her document case of artistic drawings prominently displayed on the left side of the portrait. Significant also is the depiction by David of the wife in a posture physically above the husband, somewhat atypically by late 18th century conventional standards of depicting a married couple in portraiture.

The painting is signed at the lower left: L DAVID, PARISIIS ANNO, 1788.

Recent research has shown that the depiction of Antoine Laurent Lavoisier and Marie Anne Lavoisier was originally as "wealthy tax collectors and fashionable luxury consumers", and the chemical instruments were added later. Marie Anne initially was depicted wearing a hat called a chapeau a la Tarare, suggesting a date of the summer or late fall of 1787; the red cloth over the table originally covered a gilded table in the neoclassical style, and tally books on a shelf behind the couple (repainted into a plain wall), suggesting David's initial portrait depicted a wealthy aristocratic couple which he later altered into a depiction of scientific partners.

Legacy 
The painting is on permanent display at the Metropolitan Museum of Art in New York City.

References

External links
Europe in the age of enlightenment and revolution, a catalog from The Metropolitan Museum of Art Libraries (fully available online as PDF), which contains material on this painting (see index)

1788 paintings
Lavoisier
Paintings in the collection of the Metropolitan Museum of Art
Lavoisier